is a former Japanese football player.

Club statistics

References

External links

1981 births
Living people
Shizuoka Sangyo University alumni
Association football people from Tokyo
Japanese footballers
J1 League players
J2 League players
Japan Football League players
Omiya Ardija players
Tochigi SC players
Association football goalkeepers